The 2011–12 CERH European League was the 47th season of the CERH European League, Europe's premier roller hockey tournament, and the 15th season since it was renamed from Champions League to European League. It took place from 19 December 2011 to 27 May 2011. Sixteen teams from seven national associations qualified for the competition as a result of their domestic league placing in the previous season. Following a group stage the eight best teams contested a final eight tournament, which took place at the PalaCastellotti arena in Lodi. The tournament was won by HC Coinasa Liceo, who beat Barcelona Sorli Discau, obtaining their second consecutive win.

Teams distribution
Since the title holders, HC Coinasa Liceo, qualified to the group stage through their domestic league, the spot reserved to the defending champion spot was vacated. 
The CERH decided to discontinue club ranking as a criterion to select the participating teams. In 2011–2012, for the first year, the qualifying clubs were selected using association ranking, with a criterion similar to that of the UEFA Champions League.

Teams allocation by country:

Teams
The following teams participated to the group stage:

Group stage 
The 16 teams were placed in 4 groups, with the two best placed teams from each group advancing to the Final Eight.

Group A

Group B

Group C

Group D

Final Eight

The 2012 Final Eight was contested in Lodi, in the PalaCastellotti arena, from 24 to 27 May 2012. HC Coinasa Liceo won the tournament, beating Barcelona Sorli Discau in the final.

References

External links
 CERH website

International
  Roller Hockey links worldwide
  Mundook-World Roller Hockey

CERH European League
Rink Hockey Euroleague
2012 in roller hockey